Walter Aston may refer to:

Walter Aston (14th-century MP) for Leominster
Sir Walter Aston (MP for Staffordshire) (1530–1589), of Tixall, a Knight of the Shire and Sheriff of Staffordshire
Walter Aston (burgess) (c. 1606–1656), member of the Virginia House of Burgesses
Walter Aston (actor), British stage actor
Walter Aston (Namibian MP), Members of the Constituent Assembly of Namibia

Lord Astons
Walter Aston, 1st Lord Aston of Forfar (1584–1639)
Walter Aston, 2nd Lord Aston of Forfar (1609–1678)
Walter Aston, 4th Lord Aston of Forfar (1660/1661–1748)
Walter Aston, 3rd Lord Aston of Forfar (1633–1714)
Walter Aston, 8th Lord Aston of Forfar (1732–1805)
Walter Aston, 7th Lord Aston of Forfar (died 1763)
Walter Aston, 9th Lord Aston of Forfar (1769–1845)